Adham El Idrissi (born 17 March 1997) is a Dutch professional footballer who plays as a winger for Greek Football League club Kalamata.

He has been likened to former AFC Ajax player Luis Suarez due to their similar style of play.

Club career 
El Idrissi is a youth exponent from AFC Ajax. He made his professional debut at Jong Ajax on 8 August 2016 in an Eerste Divisie game against FC Emmen. In January 2017 El Idrissi was released, has yet to sign with a new club.

Personal life
Born in the Netherlands, El Idrissi is of Moroccan descent. He is a youth international for the Netherlands.

References

1997 births
Living people
Footballers from Amsterdam
Dutch footballers
Dutch expatriate footballers
Netherlands youth international footballers
Dutch sportspeople of Moroccan descent
AFC Ajax players
Jong Ajax players
ASV De Dijk players
SC Telstar players
Kalamata F.C. players
Eerste Divisie players
Tweede Divisie players
Football League (Greece) players
Association football forwards
Dutch expatriate sportspeople in Greece
Expatriate footballers in Greece